"Don't Stop Can't Stop" is song by South Korean boy band, 2PM. It was released as digital and physical single format by April 19, 2010. "Without U" was coupled this single, which reached number one on several music charts. Though not as an official single announced, a music video for "목숨을 건다 (I Will Give You My Life)" was made and released on June 10, 2010.

Track listing

Release history

References

External links
 Official Website

2PM EPs
2010 EPs
JYP Entertainment EPs
Korean-language EPs
JYP Entertainment singles
Kakao M singles